Walkley Road (Ottawa Road #74) is a major road in Ottawa, Ontario, Canada.  It runs from Riverside Drive to Ramseyville Road (formerly Baseline Road).  It is mostly a four-lane divided road which runs through both residential and industrial areas of the southern part of urban Ottawa.

See also
 List of roads in Ottawa

External links

 Ottawa 2020 Transportation Master Plan

Roads in Ottawa